Gorenje Jesenice is a village in the Municipality of Šentrupert in southeastern Slovenia. The area is part of the historical region of Lower Carniola. The municipality is now included in the Southeast Slovenia Statistical Region. 

The local church is dedicated to Saint Cantius and belongs to the Parish of Šentrupert. It was first mentioned in written documents dating to 1526 with some 17th- and 18th-century remodelling.

References

External links

Gorenje Jesenice at Geopedia

Populated places in the Municipality of Šentrupert